Hypno5e is a French avant-garde metal band formed in Montpellier in 2003. They released their debut album Des Deux l'Une Est l'Autre in January 2007. Hypno5e uses lyrics in both French and English (as well as Castilian Spanish on "Tio" from their 2016 album Shores of the Abstract Line). The band has toured throughout France and the United States with other bands such as Gojira, the Ocean Collective, Watcha, Black Bomb A and Eths.

Members

Current members
Emmanuel Jessua – vocals, guitar (2003–present)
Jonathan Maurois – guitar (2011–present)
Pierre Rettien – drums (2022–present)
Charles Villanueva – bass (2022–present)

Former members
Thibault Lamy – drums, samples (2003–2012)
Jérémie Lautier – guitar (2004–2010)
Cédric "Gredin" Pages – bass, backing vocals (2005–2022)
Théo Begue – drums, samples (2012–2021)
Maxime Mangeant – drums (2021–2022)

Timeline

Discography

Studio albums 
 Des deux l'une est l'autre (2007)
 A Backward Glance on a Travel Road (2009) (as A Backward Glance on a Travel Road)
 Acid Mist Tomorrow (2012)
 Shores of the Abstract Line (2016)
 Alba - Les ombres errantes (2018)
 A Distant (Dark) Source (2019)
 Sheol (2023)

EPs 
 Manuscrit côté MS408 (2005)

Demos 
 H492053 (2004)

Singles 
 "A Distant Dark Source" (2019)
 "Tauca - Part II (Nowhere)" (2019)
 "Sheol" (2022)

Sources

External links 
Official website
Facebook page
MySpace page
Bandcamp
HQ Live video from Motocultor Festival 2016

Avant-garde metal musical groups
French progressive metal musical groups
Musical groups established in 2003
Musical quartets
Organizations based in Montpellier
Musical groups from Occitania (administrative region)